Aminul Islam Chowdhury (born 1921) was a Bangladeshi politician and businessman. He was a Member of Parliament of Pakistan (MNA) before East Pakistan became Bangladesh and represented a region in Comilla.

Early life and career
Chowdhury was the son of Serajul Islam Chowdhury, Zamindar of Alkora. He studied Economics at the University of Calcutta in India. He was involved in many industries such as aluminum, deep sea trawler fishing, seafood export etc. and won international awards for outstanding business performance. He was also the founder and chairman of the Chittagong Chamber of Commerce & Industry. Chowdhury created various companies such as Bayview but the most successful were Amin Fish Farms and Industries Limited. It has been awarded numerous times for its export performance.

After retirement, he was involved in various organizations such as the Bangladesh Human Rights Commission where he was the chairman for many years.

Personal life
Chowdhury was married to Jahanara Begum Chowdhury and had three daughters, Zakia, Mumtaz and Rebeka.

References 

1921 births
Possibly living people
Bangladeshi politicians
Pakistani MNAs 1965–1969
University of Calcutta alumni